Mali Music may refer to:

 Mali Music (album), a 2002 album by Damon Albarn
 Mali Music (singer) (born 1988), American recording artist, singer-songwriter and producer
 Music of Mali